Unrest is a role-playing video game created by the independent development studio Pyrodactyl Games (based in Jaipur, India). The game is notable for being one of the first commercial RPGs to take place in Ancient India. The game was released on Microsoft Windows, Mac OS X, and Linux platforms on July 23, 2014.

Gameplay 
Unrest is a role-playing video game. It plays in a 2-dimensional perspective, with graphics designed to look hand-drawn. A large portion of the game involves making dialogue choices to influence NPCs and progress the story. NPCs all possess and react based on three values: Friendship, Respect, and Fear.

Combat is relatively rare, always avoidable, and very risky. However, playable character death does not result in a Game Over. Instead, the game proceeds to the next chapter, with the previous playable character's death influencing how the story ultimately plays out.

Plot 
The game takes place in ancient India in a time of great social upheaval. It also contains some fantasy elements, such as the Naga, a race of snakelike humanoids.

The game's story is divided into eight chapters, with players taking on the role of five different characters, who each have their own back story. The playable characters include a peasant girl who doesn't want to go through her arranged marriage, an elderly priest, the chief of the mercenary guild, and the sole heir of the former royal family who now lives as a street urchin.

Development 
The developers posted the game on Kickstarter. The campaign started with an initial goal of US$3,000 to finish the game. On the second day of the campaign, the goal had been met. The developers included stretch goals in the campaign which included enhancing the visuals and additional chapters. The campaign ended on June 21, 2013, with Unrest raising $36,251. On August 3, 2020, Arvind Raja Yadav from Pyrodactyl Games released the source code for the game under the MIT License on GitHub.

Reception 

Unrest received "mixed" reviews according to the review aggregation website Metacritic.

Hardcore Gamer gave it a score of three-and-a-half stars out of five and called it "a choice-driven RPG with little combat to speak of that touches on relevant social issues." National Post gave it six out of ten and called it "a bold, powerful, and interesting game. I'm just not sure how much fun it is." Common Sense Media also gave it three stars out of five and said, "There's plenty to admire about this daring, story-driven RPG experience, but it's not quite as accessible or polished as one might have hoped." Paste gave it a similar score of six out of ten and said, "For a game that sets out with intent to include elements rarely embraced in games, Unrest comes across as an underwhelming mixture of a smartly constructed core without any layers to complement it."

References

External links 

2014 video games
Commercial video games with freely available source code
Crowdfunded video games
Fantasy video games
Indie video games
Kickstarter-funded video games
Linux games
MacOS games
Open-source video games
Fiction about rebellions
Role-playing video games
Single-player video games
Software using the MIT license
Video games about old age
Video games based on Hindu mythology
Video games developed in India
Video games featuring female protagonists
Video games set in India
Video games with alternate endings
Windows games